Gulladuff is a small village and townland in County Londonderry, Northern Ireland. In the 2001 Census it had a population of 405 people. It is situated within Mid-Ulster District.

Gulladuff is home to a Mid-Ulster Sinn Féin Centre, an Irish republican garden of remembrance and Lavey GAC grounds.

References

External links
NI Neighbourhood Information System

Villages in County Londonderry
Mid-Ulster District